The 36th Legislative Assembly of British Columbia sat from 1996 to 2001. The members were elected in the British Columbia general election held in May 1996. The New Democratic Party (NDP) led by Glen Clark formed the government. Clark resigned as premier in August 1999; Dan Miller served as interim premier until a leadership election was held in February 2000 where Ujjal Dosanjh became party leader and premier. The Liberals led by Gordon Campbell formed the official opposition.

Dale Lovick served as speaker for the assembly until 1998 when Gretchen Brewin became speaker. Brewin served as speaker until 2000; William James Hartley replaced Brewin as speaker for the remaining sessions.

Members of the 36th General Assembly 
The following members were elected to the assembly in 1996:

Notes:

Party standings

By-elections 
By-elections were held to replace members for various reasons:

Notes:

Other changes 
Richard Neufeld joins the Liberals on October 7, 1997.
Jack Weisgerber becomes an Independent on November 28, 1997.
Paul Reitsma was expelled from the Liberal caucus on April 1, 1998, and resigned from the Liberal party the following day. He resigns from the legislature on June 23.
Gordon Wilson joins the NDP on January 29, 1999.
Rick Kasper becomes an Independent on October 10, 2000.
Jeremy Dalton becomes an Independent on January 11, 2001.
Bonnie McKinnon becomes and Independent on March 5, 2001.

References 

Political history of British Columbia
Terms of British Columbia Parliaments
1996 establishments in British Columbia
2001 disestablishments in British Columbia
20th century in British Columbia
21st century in British Columbia